John Harry may refer to:
Jack Harry (1857–1919), Australian cricketer
John Harry (MP) (fl. 1410), MP for Hastings
John ap Harry, MP for Herefordshire (UK Parliament constituency) in 1406, 1407 and 1410

See also

John Harrys
John Harris (disambiguation)